The Karachi Port Trust (KPT) is a Pakistani federal government agency under the administrative control of the Federal Maritime Secretary that oversees the operations of the Port of Karachi, one of South Asia's largest and busiest deep-water seaports which handles about 60% of the nation's cargo. The agency is headquartered at the colonial-era Karachi Port Trust Building.

Between 1880 and 1887, the port was administered by the Karachi Harbour Board. The Karachi Port Trust was then established by the Act IV of 1886, effective from 1 April 1887.

The Karachi Port is administered by a board of trustees of the Karachi Port Trust, composed of the chairman and 10 trustees. The chairman, who is appointed by the Federal Government, is also the chief executive. The current chairman is Nadir Mumtaz Warraich. The chairman is assisted by six general managers. Around 4748 workers and 315 officers are employed in KPT.

References

 A Short History of Karachi Port, M. Adil Qureshi, Education Officer, KPT

External links

 Karachi Port Trust - Official site

Pakistan federal departments and agencies
Port of Karachi
Water transport in Pakistan
Buildings and structures in Karachi
British colonial architecture
British colonial architecture in India
Government agencies established in 1887
Ministry of Maritime Affairs (Pakistan)